Arnoglossum is a North American genus of plants in the family Asteraceae, described as a genus in 1817. They have the common name Indian plantain because they resemble the unrelated common plantain (Plantago spp.).

Arnoglossum is a member of the tribe Senecioneae which has been undergoing extensive revisions in recent years. Many of the species now in the genus were formerly classified in other genera such as Cacalia, Mesadenia, and Senecio. The remaining species are all native to North America (Ontario and eastern United States).

The name Arnoglossum is from the Greek word "arnos" meaning lamb, and "glossum" meaning tongue and is the  ancient name for some species of Plantago.

 Species
 Arnoglossum album L.C.Anderson  - Florida
 Arnoglossum atriplicifolium (L.)H.Rob. - pale Indian plantain - much of eastern + central USA
 Arnoglossum diversifolium (Torr. & A.Gray) H.Rob. - variable-leaved Indian plantain - Georgia, Florida, Alabama
 Arnoglossum floridanum (A.Gray) H.Rob. - Florida cacalia  - Florida
 Arnoglossum ovatum (Walter) H.Rob. - Ovateleaf cacalia - from eastern Texas to North Carolina
 Arnoglossum plantagineum Raf. - tuberous Indian-plantain or groovestem Indian plaintain - from Ontario south as far as Texas and Alabama
 Arnoglossum reniforme (Hook.) H.E. Robins. - eastern USA
 Arnoglossum sulcatum (Fernald) H.Rob - Georgia Indian plaintain - Georgia, Florida, Alabama, Mississippi

References

External links

Senecioneae
Asteraceae genera
Flora of North America
Taxa named by Constantine Samuel Rafinesque